Tal-e Chegah (also Romanized as Tal-e Chegāh) is a village in Dehdasht-e Sharqi Rural District, in the Central District of Kohgiluyeh County, Kohgiluyeh and Boyer-Ahmad Province, Iran. At the 2006 census, its population was 93, in 14 families.

References 

Populated places in Kohgiluyeh County